The fourth-generation Ford Mustang is an automobile that was produced by the American manufacturer Ford for the 1994 through 2004 model years. For 1994 the Ford Mustang underwent its first major redesign in fifteen years, being introduced in November 1993 and launching on December 9, 1993. The design, code named "SN-95" by Ford, was based on an updated version of the Fox platform, the final Ford vehicle underpinned with this platform. It featured styling by Bud Magaldi that incorporated some stylistic elements from the classic Mustangs. A convertible returned, but the previous notchback and hatchback bodystyles were discontinued in favor of a conventional coupe design.

Prior to the redesigned Mustang's launch, a two-seater show car was designed by Darrell Behmer and Bud Magali. Called the Mustang Mach III, it was shown at the 1993 North American International Auto Show in Detroit and hinted at what the new production Mustang would look like. While this engine was not put into production, it hinted to the future use of Ford's Modular V8 in the Mustang, including the eventual use of a supercharged 4.6 L V8.

Mustang (1994–1998) 
The base Mustang featured Ford's 3.8 L OHV Essex V6 mated to a standard 5-speed manual transmission or an optional AODE 4-speed automatic transmission. For 1996, the base V6 gained five horsepower with a new power train control module (PCM), the EEC-V. The AODE transmission was replaced with the 4R70W 4-speed automatic transmission for 1996.

Ford allocated $700 million to improve the Fox platform for the 1994 Mustang. Efforts were made to improve the car's handling as well as noise, vibration, and harshness (NVH) conditions over the previous generation Mustang. The Mustang's front suspension makes use of MacPherson struts with longer lower control arms, new spindles, anti-roll bars, and other enhancements over 1993 and older Mustangs. In the rear, a four-bar link solid axle is used. The 1994 Mustang's standard rear axle ratio was 2.73:1, though this was later changed to 3.27:1. All Mustangs received standard four-wheel disc brakes, though anti-lock brakes (ABS) were optional.

Along with its new exterior, the 1994 Mustang received new interior styling. The Mustang's cabin featured a "dual-cockpit" layout that was adorned with contours and sweeping curves, similarly to other Fords of the time such as the Thunderbird. The 1994 Mustang offered many options, some of which later became standard equipment. The preferred equipment package came with power windows, mirrors, and door locks, remote keyless entry, air conditioning, cruise control, and a trunk cargo net. Also available was Ford's Mach 460, 230-watt multi-speaker sound system with CD player. All 1994 Mustangs received standard three-point seat belts and dual front airbags. Also, the taillight design for 1996 changed from three horizontal strips to three vertical sections more in line with classic Mustang tradition. Production of this Mustang ran until October 1998.

Mustang GT 
Following the base Mustang in December 1993, the Mustang GT was reintroduced in January 1994, featuring higher performance and better handling than the base Mustang or its 1993 predecessor. Ford carried over the 302 CID pushrod small-block V8 engine (called the "5.0 L" although its actual displacement was 4.94 L) from the 1993 Mustang GT. Mustang GTs could deliver zero to  acceleration times in the high-six second range and complete a quarter-mile in about 15 seconds. The Mustang GT also featured a stiffer handling suspension, a 3.08:1 rear axle ratio (later changed to 3.27:1 or 3.55:1 depending on the transmission and model year), dual exhausts, and larger  wheels (compared to the base Mustang's 15-inch wheels). The 1994 Mustang GT was named Motor Trend Car of the Year.

For 1995, a one-year model referred to as the Mustang GTS was introduced. This was considered to be a "stripped down" version of the Mustang GT that included the performance parts of the GT model, but a minimum of non-performance related features, similar in concept to the 5.0 LX Fox-body. The 1995 GT was the last year of the 5.0 pushrod V8 engine. 

In 1996, Ford dropped the 302 CID small block V8 that was in production since 1968 and introduced the Modular 4.6 L SOHC V8. These engines were produced at two different plants, Windsor and Romeo. A "W" in the VIN 8th digit indicates a "Romeo" engine, while an "X" indicates a "Windsor".

The Windsor and Romeo have subtle differences. Valve cover bolt patterns are one. Romeo has fewer bolts than the Windsor. Another difference is the front cover bolts. The Windsor uses 8 mm and the Romeo uses 10 mm bolts. The Romeo uses jack screws on the main caps and the Windsor uses dowels. This was achieved through PCM calibration and a modified fuel system. Though capable of matching or exceeding the older 302 V8's output, the 4.6 L V8 was criticized for delivering inadequate performance, particularly against the larger displacement of the OHV V8 used in the Mustang's chief rival, the Chevrolet Camaro.

Mustang Cobra 

Building on the performance of the Mustang GT, Ford's Special Vehicle Team (SVT) developed an even higher performance car: the Mustang Cobra. For the 1994 and 1995 model years, the 5.0L V8 was modified for the Cobra with unique intake manifolds, cams, fuel injectors, and heads. Suspension and brakes were also changed with 13-inch front discs with "COBRA" embossed calipers as well as Cobra specific shocks, struts, and springs. In 1996 it was available in a special color package called the Mystic Cobra which consisted of an expensive Chrom-a-lusion exterior finish like the Mysti-Chrome package on 2004 models.

The "New Edge" (1999–2004) 

A redesigned SN-95 Mustang came on December 26, 1998, for the 1999 model year with production starting in November 1998, informally known as the SN-99 Mustang platform/variant. Characterizing the redesign was Ford's New Edge design language, which featured sharper contours, larger wheel arches, and creases in the bodywork, replacing many of the soft lines of the previous model. The Mustang also received new wheels and hubcaps. However, the car carried over the same roofline and interior, in addition to the same basic platform. All 1999 Mustangs (except the Cobra) received "35th-Anniversary" badges on the front fenders.

A "35th Anniversary Limited Edition" appearance option package came on 2,318 GT coupes and 2,310 GT convertibles. Available only in black, silver metallic, white, and red, they featured a body-colored hood scoop, rear spoiler, side scoops and rocker panels, a blacked-out panel between the taillamps, and 17 by  five-spoke aluminum wheels; while the interiors included black leather and vinyl seats with silver inserts and pony logo, aluminum shift knob, a unique instrument cluster with 35th anniversary script, silver and black floor mats with 35th anniversary logo, and silver door trim inserts.

The 3.8 L Essex V6 returned as the base engine for 1999.

For 1999, the Mustang also received a change to its taillights, making them edgier, with sharp corners and straight lines as opposed to the rounded off style of previous years. The lamps were still composed of three vertical segments, reminiscent of the original. Minimal changes occurred from year-to-year, most noticeable was a redesigned center panel in the dashboard for 2001, which now allowed double-din stereo head units, including an in-dash six-CD player. The rear window defroster switch, previously mounted below the headlamp pull switch, was moved to the lower center stack below the stereo. When equipped, the fog lamp switch was relocated to the lower center stack as well, previously, it was on the center console adjacent to the cup holders. The third button on the lower switch panel was for the traction control system (on V8 models). On convertible models, the power roof switch remained on the center console - on coupe models, that switch was replaced with a small coin holder.

During the second half of the 2004 model year, the 3.8 L Essex was replaced with a slightly revised 3.9 L version with a slightly longer stroke but a power output identical to the outgoing 3.8 L. The 3.9 L Essex was used in the Mustang for only half a year before being replaced by the 4.0 L Cologne V6 for the 2005 model year. The last Mustang for this generation was produced on May 10, 2004.

Mustang Cobra (1999, 2001, and 2003–2004) 

It also featured independent rear suspension which changed the route of the exhaust pipes, forcing them to go under the axle which provided a unique look compared to the base and GT models. 

Special editions 

In 2000, a unique trim level called the "Spring Feature Edition" was available on GT models. Offered only in Performance Red, Laser Red, Black, Silver, White, or Zinc Yellow, the Spring Feature package contained  performance wheels and tires, a body-colored hood scoop, body-colored side scoops, two black "GT" stripes on the hood, and black "Mustang" inserts on the embossed bumper. Ford produced 3,091 Spring Feature GTs.

In 2001, the Special Edition Bullitt was released to the public. Available only as coupe, the Bullitt was a mildly upgraded version of the standard GT. Factory upgrades included with a lowered suspension (3/4 inch), subframe connectors (used on the convertible models), Tokico shocks, and brakes from the Cobra (13 in front, 11.7 in rear). The car also received an upgraded exhaust and a re-designed intake. On the exterior, the car received unique Torq-Thrust style wheels, removal of the fog lights (for the US market; Canadian cars retained them) and rear deck spoiler, as well as new trim accents. It was available in three colors: Dark Highland Green, True Blue, and Black.

The success of the 2001 Bullitt led to the production of a second special edition, the 2003 to 2004 Mach 1. The Mach 1 was equipped with a 4.6 L DOHC  engine based on the engine available in the 1999 and 2001 Mustang Cobras, with new cylinder heads from the 2003 to 2004 Cobra (see above). The interior of the car was given a retro theme with seats made to look like the "comfort-weave" seats available in the 1960s-era Mach 1s. It also featured retro-themed gauges and a unique aluminum shifter ball. On the vehicle's exterior, a Mach 1 package was applied, consisting of a functional Shaker scoop, a unique 3-tier hood, decals set on the hood, rocker/door panels, a special chin spoiler, a flat black-rear-spoiler, Magnum 500 style wheels, and the C-Pillar covers used on the 1994-1998 Mustang. The car also received similar suspension upgrades as the Bullitt including unique Tokico struts on the rear and the convertible-spec subframe connectors.

In 2004, Ford produced a special 40th Anniversary Edition of the Mustang. As an $895 option available in both Standard and GT editions, coupe or convertible, it consisted of 40th Anniversary badging, enhanced interior with "40th Anniversary" floor mats, painted folding exterior mirrors from the Cobra models, a tan cloth convertible top (instead of canvas), Arizona Beige painted "Bullitt" wheels, and Arizona Beige stripes on the hood, trunk and lower bodysides. The anniversary package was available in Crimson Red (exclusive to package), Oxford White or black. Ford produced 4,558 Crimson Red models. Crimson Red, Ford paint code "FX", was also called Merlot on several other Ford models from the 2002 through 2008 model years. Most 40th Anniversary package cars came with Parchment (tan) leather interiors. Some came with black leather. This is possibly a Canadian variation. This possible Canada-only variation also features 2003 Cobra wheels, no hood stripes and 'Mustang' decals on the lower-body side panels under the doors. Other than two pre-production units, all Crimson Red vehicles were built from August through November 2003. Forty-one of the Crimson Red cars were sent to Roush Industries for conversions into Roush Mustangs. It marked the end of this design of the Mustang, as 2005 ushered in an all-new model.

Ford celebrated its 100th Anniversary in June 2003, and made limited edition F-Series Super Duty trucks, Explorers, Taurus, Focus, and Mustang GTs to commemorate the event. The 100th Anniversary models only came in black and included Premium Verona-grain Imola leather seating surfaces in two-tone parchment, and the Mustang got the GT premium package which included 17-inch wheels, anti-lock brakes and traction control; dual exhaust; power driver's seat with power lumbar support; leather-wrapped steering wheel; and Mach 1000 or Mach 460 AM/FM Stereo with six-disc CD changer, as well as 40th Anniversary badges on the fender and decklid and embossed on the seats. The Centennial Package was a $995 upgrade.

Right-hand drive conversion 

Ford Australia
This generation was sold in Australia for two years from 2001 to 2002 as to compete against the Holden Monaro (which eventually became the basis for the reborn Pontiac GTO). Due to the fact that the Mustang was never designed for right-hand-drive, Ford Australia contracted Tickford Vehicle Engineering to convert 250 Mustangs and modify them to meet Australian Design Rules per year. Sales did not meet expectations, due in part to a very high selling price. In total, just 377 Mustangs were sold in Australia between 2001–2003.

For promotional purposes, Ford Racing Australia built a Mustang V10 convertible, which was powered by a Ford Modular 6.8-Litre V10 engine from the American F-Series Super Duty truck but with an Australian-made supercharger.

Engine output summary 

† supercharged

Footnotes

External links

2000s cars
Mustang 4th
Rear-wheel-drive vehicles
Muscle cars
Cars introduced in 1993
Coupés
Convertibles